Bünyadabad is a village in the municipality of Səmədabad in the Yevlakh Rayon of Azerbaijan.

References

Populated places in Yevlakh District